The following outline is provided as an overview of and topical guide to the psychiatric survivors movement:

Psychiatric survivors movement – diverse association of individuals who are either currently clients of mental health services, or who consider themselves survivors of interventions by psychiatry, or who identify themselves as ex-patients of mental health services. The movement typically campaigns for more choice and improved services, for empowerment and user-led alternatives, and against the prejudices they face in society.

What is the psychiatric survivors movement? 

 The psychiatric survivors movement can be described as all of the following:
 a political movement
 a human rights movement
 part of the disability rights movement
 Psychiatric survivors as a group is:
 an advocacy group
 a community
 a special interest group

Participants 
 Victim of psychiatry
 Mental health consumer
 Mental patient : currently redirects to Mental disorder
 Former mental patient
 Lunatic

Supporters
 Richard Bentall
 Patch Adams
 Robert Whittaker
 The Radical Therapist

History of the psychiatric survivors movement 

 History of mental disorders

People
18th century
 Samuel Bruckshaw
19th century
 Elizabeth Packard
Early 20th century
 Clifford Whittingham Beers
Late 20th century to the present
 Linda Andre
 Ted Chabasinski
 Judi Chamberlin
 Lyn Duff
 Leonard Roy Frank
 Kate Millett
 David Oaks

Issues

Coercion
Involuntary treatment 
Involuntary commitment
Outpatient commitment
 Mentalism (discrimination)

Pharmaceutical industry
 Pharmaceutical industry
 Allen Jones (whistleblower)
 Anatomy of an Epidemic

Harmful practices
 Eugenics
 Psychosurgery
 Electroconvulsive therapy
 Psychoactive drug

Psychiatry

Psychiatry (outline)
 Mental disorder
History of mental disorder
 Mental Health
 Therapeutic relationship

Psychiatric services

 Services for mental disorders
 Care programme approach (UK)

Public agencies

United Kingdom
England and Wales
 Commissioners in Lunacy
United States of America
Federal Bodies
 National Council on Disability
 New Freedom Commission on Mental Health

Legal framework for psychiatric treatment 

 See Outline of psychiatry#Legal framework for psychiatric treatment

Organisations

Advocacy groups, by region

International/Cross-border groups 
 Pan-African Network of People with Psychosocial Disabilities
 European Network of Users and Survivors of Psychiatry
 MindFreedom International
 TCI-Aisa
 GROW
 World Network of Users and Survivors of Psychiatry

United Kingdom 
 Alleged Lunatics' Friend Society (19C)
 Survivors Speak Out (20C)
 United Kingdom Advocacy Network (20C)
 MindLink
 National Service User Network (21C)
 Mental Health Resistance Network (21C)

Norway 
 We Shall Overcome
 Aurora
 Mental Helse
 White Eagle
 LPP

Canada 
 Mental Patients' Association

Germany 
 Socialist Patients' Collective
 Bundesverband Psychiatrie-Erfahrener BPE-eV
 International Association Against Psychiatric Assault

Netherlands 
 Clientenbond
 Geesdrift

United States 
 Committee for Truth in Psychiatry
 Hearing Voices Movement
 Hearing Voices Network
 Icarus Project
 Insane Liberation Front
 Mad Pride
 Mental Patients Liberation Front
 MindFreedom International
 National Empowerment Center
 Network Against Psychiatric Assault
 Mental Patients' Liberation Alliance

France

Switzerland

Sweden

Australia

New Zealand

Self-help groups 
 Self-help groups
 Self-help groups for mental health

Related movements

Anti-psychiatry movement

People
 Franco Basaglia
 David Cooper (psychiatrist)
 Michel Foucault
 R.D. Laing
 Loren Mosher
 Thomas Szasz anti-coercive psychiatry

Publications
 Against Therapy
 Anti-Oedipus
 Liberation by Oppression: A Comparative Study of Slavery and Psychiatry
 Madness and Civilization

Organisations
 American Association for the Abolition of Involuntary Mental Hospitalization

See also 

 Against Therapy
 Antipsychology
 Biopsychiatry controversy
 Democratic Psychiatry
 Feeble-minded
 Icarus Project
 Independent living
 Insanity
 Interpretation of Schizophrenia
 Involuntary treatment
 Liberation by Oppression: A Comparative Study of Slavery and Psychiatry
 Mad Pride
Mad Studies
 Medicalization
 Mental patient
 MindFreedom International
 National Empowerment Center
 Peer support
 Peer support specialist
 Philadelphia Association
 Positive Disintegration
 Psychiatric rehabilitation
 Psychoanalytic theory
 Radical Psychology Network
 Recovery model
 Rosenhan experiment
 Self-advocacy
 Social firms
 Soteria
 Therapeutic community
 World Network of Users and Survivors of Psychiatry

People
 Judi Chamberlin
 Kate Millett
 Kingsley Hall
 Leonard Roy Frank
 Linda Andre
 Loren Mosher
 Lyn Duff
 Ted Chabasinski

 Health and mortality
Physical health in schizophrenia
Schizophrenia and smoking

External links 

 CAN (Mental Health) Inc - Australia
 The Mental Health Rights Coalition - Hamilton, ON, Canada
 Recovering Consumers and a Broken Mental Health System in the United States: Ongoing Challenges for Consumers/ Survivors and the New Freedom Commission on Mental Health. Part I: Legitimization of the Consumer Movement and Obstacles to It., by McLean, A. (2003), International Journal of Psychosocial Rehabilitation. 8, 47-57
 Recovering Consumers and a Broken Mental Health System in the United States: Ongoing Challenges for Consumers/ Survivors and the New Freedom Commission on Mental Health. Part II: Impact of Managed Care and Continuing Challenges, by McLean, A. (2003),  International Journal of Psychosocial Rehabilitation. 8, 58–70.

 History
Guide on the History of the Consumer Movement from the National Mental Health Consumers' Self-Help Clearinghouse

 Organizations
MindFreedom International
National Mental Health Consumers' Self-Help Clearinghouse

Psychiatric survivors movement
Psychiatric survivors movement
Psychiatric survivors movement